Michael Stonier (born 9 January 1969) is a South African cricketer. He played in 30 first-class and 26 List A matches from 1988/89 to 1994/95.

References

External links
 

1969 births
Living people
South African cricketers
Border cricketers
Eastern Province cricketers
Western Province cricketers
Cricketers from East London, Eastern Cape